Norman Moore may refer to:

Norman Moore (footballer) (1919–2007), English footballer
Sir Norman Moore, 1st Baronet (1847–1922), British doctor and biographer
Norman Moore (politician) (born 1945), Australian politician
Norman W. Moore (1923–2015), conservationist, professor and baronet